Marcus Session is a former American professional basketball player.  He was born December 3, 1981, in Houston, Texas.  He attended Milby High School, where he played for Coach Boyce Honea.  Marcus began his college career at San Jacinto College where he played for coach Scott Gernander two years. He later went on to attend St. Mary's University, Texas where he played for coach Buddy Meyer.

Professional Basketball Career 
In professional basketball he started in the pre-season and mini camp with the San Antonio Spurs in 2004.  He later played for the Busan KT Sonicboom  (S. Korea), Criollos de Caguas (basketball)  (Puerto Rico), Espartanos de Margarita (LNB, VEN), Jilin Northeast Tigers (China), Houston Takers (ABA), Deportes Puerto Varas (Chile-DiMayor), Bucaneros De Campeche (MEX-LNBP), tested by Baloncesto Málaga , London Lions (basketball), a short stint with the New Mexico Thunderbirds (NBA D-League), Al Ahli SC (Doha) , Rizing Fukuoka (Japan) contractually, TV Langen (Germany).

Other Work 
He currently works as an international Pro Basketball Scout with Kingdom Works Sports Agency, an Educator, Author, Public Speaker, Urban Youth Advocacy and a College Professor.  Marcus released his first book entitled "Working With The At-Risk Teen" in March 2016. His second book, Mila's First Day, is the first installment of a children's book series created after his daughter. He has also recorded a Christian Rap Album in 2008 entitled "Motivation" under the stage name M-Session.  He has also spoken at many basketball camps, clinics, schools, and youth events around the world.  In 2020, Marcus began his career in public radio as co-host for the show OneVoice which airs on KTSU 90.9 Houston. KTSU 90.9 is a public radio station based out of the historic Texas Southern University in Houston, Texas.

References 

1981 births
Living people
American men's basketball players
Bucaneros de Campeche players
Guaiqueríes de Margarita players
Rizing Zephyr Fukuoka players
American expatriate basketball people in Mexico
Basketball players from Houston
Criollos de Caguas basketball players